Paphiopedilum subgenus Brachypetalum is a subgenus of the genus Paphiopedilum.

Distribution
Plants from this section are found from western China to Myanmar, Vietnam, Laos, Thailand, to Cambodia, Malaysia .

Species
Paphiopedilum subgenus Brachypetalum comprises the following species:

References

Orchid subgenera